Kerry Lauerman is an American journalist. He has been the top editor at Mic and Salon, a senior editor at The Washington Post and Mother Jones and co-founder of the animal-focused site The Dodo. He is executive editor at Forbes.

References 

American journalists
American newspaper editors
The Washington Post people
Year of birth missing (living people)
Living people